West Bokaro Coalfield is located mostly in Ramgarh district and partly in Hazaribagh district in the Indian state of Jharkhand.

Overview
In 1917, L.S.S.O’Malley described the coalfields in the upper reaches of the Damodar as follows: "Near the western boundary of Jharia field is that of Bokaro, covering" , "with an estimated content of 1,500 million tons; close by… is the Ramgarh field (40 square miles), in which, however, coal is believed to be of inferior quality. A still larger field in the same district is that called Karanpura, which extends over"  "and has an estimated capacity of 9,000 million tons."

The Coalfield

Location
The  Bokaro coalfield lies between 23° 45’ and 23° 50’ North latitude and 85° 30’ and 86° 03’ East longitude. It spreads 65 km from east to west and 10 to 16 km from north to south. Bokaro West and Bokaro East are two subdivisions of the field separated almost in the middle by Lugu Hill (height ).

Bokaro River passes through the West Bokaro and East Bokaro coalfields.

Tata Steel owns and operates the open-cast West Bokaro colliery.  It has the distinction of commissioning the country's first coal washery in 1951.

Reserves

Geological reserves in the West Bokaro Coalfield in million tonnes as on 1/4/2010:

Projects

Transport
In 1927, the Central India Coalfields Railway opened the Gomoh-Barkakana line. It was extended to Daltonganj in 1929. Later these lines were amalgamated with East Indian Railway.

References

Coalfields of India
Mining in Jharkhand
Hazaribagh district